Fu or FU may refer to:

In arts and entertainment
Fool Us, Penn & Teller's magic-competition television show
Fǔ, a type of ancient Chinese vessel
Fu (poetry) (赋), a Chinese genre of rhymed prose
FU: Friendship Unlimited, a 2017 Marathi film
Fu Manchu, a fictional character first featured in a series of novels by English author Sax Rohmer
Shaq Fu, video game
Francis Urquhart, the main character in the novel House of Cards by Michael Dobbs, and in the UK television series

In music
The F.U.'s, an American band
F.U. Don't Take It Personal, an album by American hip hop group Fu-Schnickens
F.U.E.P., an EP by Lily Allen
"FU" (song), a song by Miley Cyrus from her album Bangerz
F.U. EP, a 2002 EP by Gob
"F.U.", a song by Little Mix from their 2016 album Glory Days
"F-U", a song by Yo Gotti from his 2013 album I Am
"F.U.", a song by Avril Lavigne from her seventh studio album Love Sux

In language
Fu (character) (福), meaning "prosperity", "fortune", "good luck", "blessing", or "happiness" in Chinese
Fu (kana) (ふ, フ), a symbol in Japanese syllabaries

Places
Fu (administrative division) (府), an administrative division used in Japan, and previously in China, Korea and Vietnam
Fu, Nepal
Fu County, in Shaanxi, China
Fu River (disambiguation), the name of several rivers in China (Fuhe, Fujiang, Fushui)

 Fu, Sweden, a village in Swden.

Schools and universities

In the United States
Fu Foundation School of Engineering and Applied Science, a.k.a. the Columbia School of Engineering and Applied Science, New York
Fairfield University, Fairfield, Connecticut
Finlandia University, Hancock, Michigan
Fordham University, New York
Forklift University, a forklift safety training center in the United States
Franklin University, Ohio
Rosalind Franklin University of Medicine and Science, North Chicago, Illinois
Friends University, Wichita, Kansas
Furman University, a University in Greenville, South Carolina

In other countries
FATA University, Akhorwal, Darra Adam Khel, FR Kohat, FATA, Pakistan
Free University of Berlin, Germany
Fuzhou University, Fuzhou, Fujian, China
Simon Fraser University, Vancouver, Canada, formerly known as Fraser University (FU)

In science and technology
Vought FU, an American 1920s fighter aircraft
Fixture unit, equal to a flow of one cubic foot of water per minute
Formula unit, in chemistry
Functional unit (execution unit), part of a CPU that performs the operations and calculations

Other uses
 Fu (surname), a common pronunciation for some Chinese surnames, such as 傅, 符, 付, 扶, 伏, and 富
 Fu (tally)  (符), a Chinese tally (memory aid device) made of bamboo, wood, or metal
 Fulu, a Taoist paper spell  
 Fu, a type of prepared wheat gluten in Japanese cuisine
 Fu Manchu moustache, a full mustache popularized by the fictional character
 Fu Lu Shou (福禄寿), the concept of Prosperity (Fu), Status (Lu), and Longevity (Shou) in Chinese culture
 Marco Fu, Hong Kong snooker player
 Fed-Up Party, a joke political party during the Canadian federal election of 2011
 Fuck You (disambiguation), a profane phrase
 Follow-up (disambiguation)

See also

FUBAR
Foobar
Kung fu (term)
Phoo

Phu (disambiguation)
Foo (disambiguation)